Rylan Thomas Bannon (born April 22, 1996) is an American professional baseball third baseman for the Houston Astros of Major League Baseball (MLB). He has previously played in MLB for the Baltimore Orioles and Atlanta Braves.

Amateur career
Bannon graduated from Joliet Catholic Academy and played college baseball at Xavier University. In 2017, he was the Big East Conference Baseball Player of the Year.

Professional career

Los Angeles Dodgers
Bannon was drafted by the Los Angeles Dodgers in the eighth round of the 2017 Major League Baseball draft. He signed and made his professional debut with the Ogden Raptors, batting .336/.425/.591 with ten home runs and 30 RBIs in 40 games. He began 2018 with the Rancho Cucamonga Quakes, where he hit .296 in 89 games with 20 homers and 61 RBIs and was eventually honored with the California League Most Valuable Player Award.

Baltimore Orioles
On July 18, 2018, Bannon was traded to the Baltimore Orioles along with Breyvic Valera, Dean Kremer, Yusniel Díaz, and Zach Pop in exchange for Manny Machado. He was assigned to the Bowie Baysox and finished the season there, batting .204 with two home runs and 11 RBIs in 32 games. He split the 2019 season between Bowie and the Norfolk Tides, hitting a combined .266 with 11 home runs and 59 RBI. He was selected to play in the Arizona Fall League for the Surprise Saguaros following the 2019 season. Bannon did not play in a game in 2020 due to the cancellation of the minor league season because of the COVID-19 pandemic.

On November 20, 2020, Bannon was added to the 40-man roster. Bannon spent the majority of the 2021 season in Triple-A Norfolk, but struggled to a .177/.297/.370 batting line with 15 home runs, 36 RBI, and 9 stolen bases.

On May 12, 2022, Bannon was recalled from Norfolk and promoted to the major leagues for the first time. Bannon made his MLB debut the same day against the St. Louis Cardinals, and recorded his first hit in his first at-bat off of Steven Matz. It was one of two hits he had for the Orioles, in 14 at-bats over four games.

Atlanta Braves
On August 8, 2022, Bannon was claimed off waivers by the Dodgers,  However they  designated for assignment just four days later without him appearing in any games in the Dodgers system.

On August 16, 2022, Bannon was claimed off waivers by the Atlanta Braves. He was designated for assignment on November 11.

Houston Astros
On November 18, 2022, Bannon was claimed off waivers by the Chicago Cubs, however on December 2,he was claimed off waivers again, this time by the Houston Astros.

References

External links

Xavier Musketeers bio

1996 births
Living people
Aberdeen IronBirds players
Atlanta Braves players
Baltimore Orioles players
Baseball players from Illinois
Bowie Baysox players
Major League Baseball third basemen
Norfolk Tides players
Ogden Raptors players
Rancho Cucamonga Quakes players
Sportspeople from Joliet, Illinois
Surprise Saguaros players
Xavier Musketeers baseball players